U234 or U-234 may refer to:

 German submarine U-234, a German Type X submarine used in World War II
 Uranium-234 (U-234 or 234U), an isotope of uranium